Jerome B. Simandle (April 29, 1949 – July 19, 2019) was a United States district judge of the United States District Court for the District of New Jersey.

Education and career

Born in Binghamton, New York. Simandle received a Bachelor of Science in Engineering in 1971 from Princeton University. He received a Diploma in Social Science in 1975 from the University of Stockholm in Sweden. He received a Juris Doctor in 1976 from the University of Pennsylvania Law School. After graduating from law school, Simandle served as a law clerk to Judge John F. Gerry of the United States District Court for the District of New Jersey for two years, and then as an Assistant United States Attorney at the U.S. Attorney's Office for the District of New Jersey. He was then a United States Magistrate in the same district for nine years.

Federal judicial service

Simandle was nominated by President George H. W. Bush on April 1, 1992, to a seat on the United States District Court for the District of New Jersey created by 104 Stat. 5089. He was confirmed by the United States Senate on May 21, 1992, and received his commission on May 26, 1992. He served as Chief Judge from January 2, 2012, until he assumed senior status on May 31, 2017. He died on July 19, 2019 from liver cancer.

References

Sources

1949 births
2019 deaths
Lawyers from Binghamton, New York
Princeton University alumni
Stockholm University alumni
University of Pennsylvania Law School alumni
Judges of the United States District Court for the District of New Jersey
United States district court judges appointed by George H. W. Bush
20th-century American judges
Assistant United States Attorneys
United States magistrate judges
Deaths from cancer in New Jersey
Deaths from liver cancer